HMS Subtle was a S-class submarine of the third batch built for the Royal Navy during World War II. She survived the war and was scrapped in 1959.

Design and description
The last 17 boats of the third batch were significantly modified from the earlier boats. They had a stronger hull, carried more fuel and their armament was revised. They displaced  on the surface and  submerged. The S-class submarines had a crew of 48 officers and ratings.

For surface running, the boats were powered by two  diesel engines, each driving one propeller shaft. When submerged each propeller was driven by a  electric motor. They could reach  on the surface and  underwater.

The boats were armed with seven 21-inch (533 mm) torpedo tubes. A half-dozen of these were in the bow and there was one external tube in the stern. They carried six reload torpedoes for the bow tubes for a grand total of thirteen torpedoes. Twelve mines could be carried in lieu of the internally stowed torpedoes. They were also armed with a 3-inch (76 mm) deck gun.

Construction and career
HMS Subtle was constructed by Cammell Laird and launched on 27 January 1944. She survived the Second World War, spending the period between December 1944 and May 1945 with the Eastern Fleet. Here, she sank a Japanese coaster and six sailing vessels. Together with her sister, she helped in the tracking and sinking of the Japanese heavy cruiser Haguro. Subtle was finally sold off to be broken up in July 1959 in Charlestown.

Notes

References
 
  
 
 
 

 

British S-class submarines (1931)
1944 ships
Ships built on the River Mersey
World War II submarines of the United Kingdom